Ger O'Driscoll (born 1987 in Newcestown, County Cork) is an Irish sportsperson. He plays hurling with his local club Newcestown and has been a member of the Cork senior inter-county team since 2009 due to the 2008–9 Cork senior hurling team strike.  O'Driscoll won back-to-back Munster minor titles in 2004 and 2005.

References

1987 births
Living people
Newcestown hurlers
Cork inter-county hurlers